Park is a 2016 Greek-Polish drama film directed by Sofia Exarchou. It was selected to be screened in the Discovery section at the 2016 Toronto International Film Festival.

Cast
 Dimitris Kitsos as Dimitris
 Dimitra Vlagopoulou as Anna
 Thomas Bo Larsen as Jens
 Enuki Gvenatadze as Markos
 Lena Kitsopoulou as Dimitris' Mother
 Yorgos Pandeleakis as Mother's boyfriend

References

External links
 

2016 films
2016 drama films
Greek drama films
Polish drama films
2010s Greek-language films